Thomas Hull (by 1528 – 1575/76) was an English politician.

Life
Hull was originally a clothier, probably from Devizes. The identity of Hull's wife is unrecorded, but they had five sons and one daughter.

Career
Hull was a Member of Parliament for Devizes, Wiltshire in 1553, 1554, 1555 and 1558. He was Mayor of Devizes in 1554–1555.

References

1576 deaths
Mayors of Devizes
English MPs 1553 (Mary I)
English MPs 1554–1555
English MPs 1555
English MPs 1558
Year of birth uncertain